Munden House and its estate are located between Watford, Radlett and Bricket Wood in the county of Hertfordshire, England. It is a Grade II listed building. A ford on the River Colne is found just off the Hertfordshire Way at Munden House.

It is the family seat of the Hon. Henry Holland-Hibbert, Viscount Knutsford, Lord of the Manor of Bricket Wood Common.

The river lodge is on the Hertfordshire Way near Munden House, at the end of section of path that appears to have been an avenue to the house.

It has been used as a film location for productions like Mrs Dalloway, Rosemary & Thyme (as "Engleton Park" in the 2004 episode "Swords into Ploughshares"), Midsomer Murders, Poirot, Jonathan Creek, Endeavour and Silent Witness.

References

External links 

 Official homepage

Historic house museums in Hertfordshire
Grade II listed buildings in Hertfordshire
Country houses in Hertfordshire
Aldenham